Janja Kantakouzenos (after 1435 – September 1477) was a nobleman from the mine town of Novo Brdo (then Serbian Despotate) who had economic deals in the mining industry with the Ottoman Empire after their conquest of Serbia. He was a descendant of the Kantakouzenoi that settled in Serbia after the marriage between Despot Đurađ Branković and Irene Kantakouzene.

Life
Janja's father, whose name is unknown, was a customs officer (gabelotto) at Novo Brdo during the 1440s. His father was most likely one of the Kantakouzenoi that settled Serbia after the marriage of Serbian Despot Đurađ Branković (r. 1427–1456) and Irene Kantakouzene in 1414. Janja's eldest brother was Demetrius (b. 1435), and his younger brothers were Alexios and George.

In Ragusan documents dated to 1461 and 1462, Janja is mentioned as "Jagno Catacusini de Novo Brdo". The presence of Demetrius and Janja in Novo Brdo after 1467 shows that the Kantakouzenoi were not affected by Mehmed II's massive deportation and forced settlement of the inhabitants to Istanbul, which happened that year. He had economic deals with the Ottoman Empire; in 1468 he, Yorgi Ivrana, Tomanin Kantakouzenos of Serres, and a Palaiologos of Istanbul are mentioned as tax-farmers of mines in the region of Serbia (Laz and Vilk); in 1474 he, his brother George, Nikola Danjovil and Lika received the tax-farm of the gold and silver mines of upper Serbia, for the sum of 14 million akçe. He later rented the silver mines of Novo Brdo.

Janja was executed in Istanbul in September 1477 together with his two younger brothers, his four sons and twelve grandsons, on the orders of Sultan Mehmed II. A Palaiologos buried their remains in Galata on 16 September the same year. The reason for his family's execution is not known.

Kinship
Matei Cazacu made the assumption that Janja was a relative to Mahmud Pasha's mother. According to Stavrides it is not impossible that Janja's business with the Ottomans were due to his relations to a high-standing official, such as Mahmud Pasha. Babinger mentioned that Janja was a close relative of Catherine of Cilli, the daughter of Đurađ Branković and Irene Kantakouzene. Irene's brother George was allegedly a cousin of Mahmud Pasha's mother.

See also
Dimitrije Kantakuzin

Annotations

References

Sources

 
 
 

1430s births
1477 deaths
15th-century Serbian people
15th-century Greek people
People from Novo Brdo
Businesspeople in mining
John
People of the Serbian Despotate
Medieval Serbian people of Greek descent
Executed Serbian people
15th-century executions by the Ottoman Empire